Paul Gallagher (born 5 April 1990), better known by his ring name Tucker, is a Northern Irish professional wrestler, who is currently working in the independent circuit.

Professional wrestling career 
Tucker made his debut on the European independent circuit in 2006. In his country of Northern Ireland, Tucker competed for Pro Wrestling Ulster.

WWE (2017–2018)
Tucker was a competitor in the United Kingdom Championship Tournament. Tucker faced Tyler Bate in the main event of day 1, where he was eliminated. He was brought back for the following year's United Kingdom Championship Tournament, but lost to Joe Coffey in the first round.

After being used as an enhancement talent in the newly created brand NXT UK, losing against likes of Ashton Smith, Jordan Devlin and Eddie Dennis; on 14 December, he was released from his contract.

Independent circuit (2018–present)
Tucker currently competes in Belfast promotion Titanic Wrestling where he is currently a trainer at the training school known as The Yard.

He also competes in the French promotion AYA Catch. He became AYA Catch Champion on 19 February 2020, defeating Rafael Belmont and Tristan Archer.

Championships and accomplishments 
 AYA Catch
AYA Catch Championship (1 time)
 Fight Factory Pro Wrestling
Irish Junior Heavyweight Championship (1 time)
 Pro Wrestling Ulster
PWU All-Ulster Championship (1 time)
PWU Championship (2 times)

References

External links

1990 births
Living people
Sportspeople from Belfast
Male professional wrestlers from Northern Ireland